"Mayo" is a single by South African DJ and artist DJ Speedsta featuring Yung Swiss, Tellaman, Shane Eagle and Frank Casino. "Mayo" is produced by Gemini Major, Family Tree's in-house producer. The song has peaked at number 1 on South Africa's biggest radio stations Metro FM Top 40 chart & 5FM Top 10 at 10 Hip Hop chart. On June 5, 2017 "Mayo" was certified gold by the Recording Industry of South Africa.

Music video
The music video was released on DJ Speedsta's Vevo account on September 9, 2016, and has over 1 million views on YouTube.
The song peaked at No.1 on the Trace Urban "SA Hip Hop 10" Chart on November 1, 2016.

Accolades 

The single "Mayo" was nominated for Best Collaboration and Best Hit Single at the 16th Metro FM Music Awards.

References

External links
Lyrics of this song at Bimba

2016 singles
Hip hop songs
2016 songs
South African songs
Song recordings produced by Gemini Major